Omoro District is a district in the Northern Region of Uganda.

Location
Omoro District is bordered by Gulu District to the north, Pader District to the east, Oyam District to the south and Nwoya District  to the west.

Overview
Omoro District was created by the Parliament of Uganda on 3 September 2015, and became operational on 1 July 2016. Prior to its creation, Omoro was "Omoro County" in neighboring Gulu District. The rationale for its creation was to "bring services closer to the people" and to improve "service delivery" to the constituents.

Points of interest
The main road from Kampala to Gulu (Kampala-Gulu Road), passes through the district in a general south to north direction.

Notable people
The former speaker of parliament in Uganda, Jacob Oulanyah, now deceased, concurrently served as the elected representative of Omoro District in parliament, starting back when Omoro was a county in Gulu District.

References

External links
 Uganda: NRM's Lamwaka Registers Early Lead in Omoro District

 
Acholi sub-region
Districts of Uganda
Northern Region, Uganda